Delmonico steak or steak Delmonico is one of several cuts of beef (usually ribeye), with a thick-cut preparation  popularized by Delmonico's restaurant in New York City during the mid-19th century. 

A true Delmonico steak is cut from the first 3" of the chuck eye, Some places may use any of various cuts of beef steak, using preparations that vary regionally in the United States. The term "Delmonico steak" might refer to any thick-cut steak.

In addition to the steak, the original meal also included a potato dish, known as Delmonico potatoes, prepared by making a mashed potato dish topped with grated cheese and buttered breadcrumbs, then baked until golden brown and served steaming.

See also
 List of steak dishes
 List of regional dishes of the United States

References

Beef dishes
Cuts of beef